The Association of Military Colleges and Schools of the United States (AMCSUS) is a nonprofit service organization of schools with military programs approved by the Department of Defense and which maintain good standing in their regional accrediting organizations. The purpose, as put forth in the AMCSUS Constitution, is "to promote the common interest of all members and to advance their welfare; promote and maintain high scholastic, military and ethical standards in member schools; represent the mutual interests of the member schools before the Department of Defense as well as the general public; foster and extend patriotism and respect for duly constituted authority; and cultivate citizens who love peace and who strive to maintain it."

Member military schools have armed services personnel detailed to the campus with the approval of the Department of Defense.  The schools organize their student bodies as a cadet corps, with students habitually in uniform and continually under military discipline while at the college or school. The AMCSUS Headquarters are in Fairfax, Virginia.

Member institutions
Member institutions of the Association of Military Colleges and Schools of the United States are listed below:
Senior Military College
 Virginia Military Institute (Lexington, Virginia; four-year public college)

Senior Military Colleges Which Also Enroll Civilian Students
 University of North Georgia (Dahlonega, Georgia; four-year public university)
 Norwich University (Northfield, Vermont; four-year private university)
 Texas A&M University (College Station, Texas; four-year public university)
 The Citadel, The Military College of South Carolina (Charleston, South Carolina; four-year public college)
 Virginia Tech (Blacksburg, Virginia; four-year public college)
 Virginia Women's Institute for Leadership at Mary Baldwin University, Staunton, Virginia

Military Junior Colleges
 Georgia Military College (Milledgeville, Georgia; two-year junior college and four-year high school)
 Marion Military Institute (Marion, Alabama; two-year junior college)
 New Mexico Military Institute (Roswell, New Mexico; two-year junior college and four-year high school)
 Valley Forge Military Academy and College (Wayne, Pennsylvania; two-year transfer college and four-year high school)

Military High Schools
 Admiral Farragut Academy (St. Petersburg, Florida; coeducational)
 American Military Academy (Guaynabo, Puerto Rico)
 Army and Navy Academy (Carlsbad, California)
 Benedictine High School (Richmond, Virginia)
 Camden Military Academy (Camden, South Carolina)
 Colorado Military Academy (Colorado Springs, Colorado)
 Culver Military Academy (Culver, Indiana)
 Fishburne Military School (Waynesboro, Virginia)
 Florida Air Academy (Melbourne, Florida; coeducational from 2005)
 Fork Union Military Academy (Fork Union, Virginia)
 Hargrave Military Academy (Chatham, Virginia)
 Lyman Ward Military Academy (Camp Hill, Alabama)
 Marine Military Academy (Harlingen, Texas)
 Massanutten Military Academy (Woodstock, Virginia; coeducational)
 Missouri Military Academy (Mexico, Missouri)
 New York Military Academy (Cornwall on Hudson, New York; coeducational)
 North Valley Military Institute (Sun Valley, California; coeducational)
 Oak Ridge Military Academy (Oak Ridge, North Carolina; coeducational)
 Randolph-Macon Academy (Front Royal, Virginia; coeducational)
 Riverside Military Academy (Gainesville, Georgia)
 Saint Thomas Academy (Mendota Heights, Minnesota)
 St. Catherine's Military Academy (Anaheim, California; begins at kindergarten level)
 St. John's Northwestern Military Academy (Delafield, Wisconsin)
 Texas Military Institute (San Antonio, Texas)

Associate Military High School Member
 Robert Land Academy (Wellandport, Ontario)

See also
 List of United States military schools and academies
 List of defunct United States military academies

References

Further reading
 Doctoral Dissertation on AMCSUS (1992) by Colonel Alvan C. Hadley Jr., graduate, trustee and former superintendent of the New York Military Academy, and former AMCSUS president.
 A Brief History of AMCSUS (1984 & 1990). By Colonel James M. Sellers Jr., graduate and former superintendent of Wentworth Military Academy, and former AMCSUS president.

External links

Military academies of the United States
United States senior military colleges